Schefflera abyssinica is a flowering plant in the family Araliaceae.

References

abyssinica